The women's 500 meter at the 2019 KNSB Dutch Single Distance Championships took place in Heerenveen at the Thialf ice skating rink on Saturday 29 December 2018. Although this edition was held in 2018, it was part of the 2018–2019 speed skating season.

There were 20 participants. There was a qualification selection incentive for the next following 2018–19 ISU Speed Skating World Cup tournaments.

Title holder was Jorien ter Mors.

Overview

Result

Draw

Source:

References

Single Distance Championships
2019 Single Distance
World